Air Phoenix was a short-lived airline based in Bangkok, Thailand operating out of Don Mueang International Airport.

History 
The airline was founded in 2007 and started operations in May 2008 with a flight between Bangkok and Mae Sot, which was later terminated. Air Phoenix was shut down in 2009.

Destinations 
At its height in May 2008, Air Phoenix operated scheduled flights to the following destinations:

Bangkok (Don Mueang International Airport) (base)
Chiang Mai (Chiang Mai International Airport)
Chiang Rai (Mae Fah Luang International Airport)

Fleet 
In May 2008 the Air Phoenix fleet consisted of the following aircraft:
 1 NAMC YS-11
 1 King Air B200 (used for charter services)

References 

Defunct airlines of Thailand
Airlines established in 2007
Airlines disestablished in 2009
2009 disestablishments in Thailand
Thai companies established in 2007